The Gust Laituri Homestead, in Valley County, Idaho near Lake Fork, Idaho, was listed on the National Register of Historic Places in 1982.

It was built by 1906 by Gust Laituri, who died in 1906.

It is a Finnish Log Structure in Long Valley, Idaho.

References

National Register of Historic Places in Valley County, Idaho
Buildings and structures completed in 1905
1905 establishments in Idaho
Finnish-American culture in Idaho
Finnish-American history